Yellowstone: The Music of Nature is an album by Mannheim Steamroller, released in 1989. The concept pays homage to nature and to Yellowstone National Park. It was nominated for a Grammy Award for Best New Age Album in 1991.

The album is a compilation of older tracks from Chip Davis' Fresh Aire series and six new tracks consisting of fully orchestrated pieces from notable classical composers such as Claude Debussy, Antonio Vivaldi, Ottorino Respighi, and Ferde Grofé.

Track listing
All selections composed by Chip Davis except where noted.

"Pines of Rome: I Pini Di Villa Borghese" (Ottorino Respighi)   – 2:58
"Pines of Rome: III Pini Del Gianicolo" (Ottorino Respighi)   – 7:15
"Interlude III"   – 2:26
"Ballade" (Claude Debussy)   – 7:28
"Rhodes Suite: Sunrise at Rhodes"   – 3:44
"Come Home to the Sea"   – 4:50
"Morning"   – 2:46
"Interlude 6"   – 3:11
"La Primavera (Spring): 1 Allegro" (Antonio Vivaldi)   – 3:47
"La Primavera (Spring): 3 Allegro" (Antonio Vivaldi)   – 4:57
"Nepenthe"   – 5:27
"The Sky"   - 5:02
"Grand Canyon Suite: Cloud Burst" (Ferde Grofé)   - 9:29
"Earthrise"   - 4:02
"Return to the Earth"   - 4:53

References

1989 albums
Mannheim Steamroller albums
American Gramaphone albums